August Klecka was an American politician and newspaper editor of Czech descent. He was a member of the Baltimore City Council from 1915 to 1933, representing Ward 7. Upon his election in 1915, Klecka became the first American of Czech descent to be elected to the Baltimore City Council. He was a leading personality in the Czech community and for Czech Democrats in Baltimore. Klecka represented Czech voters and ran the Slavic Building and Loan Association. He also performed as acting mayor of Baltimore for a time in 1931.

Klecka was born on 2 February 1878. His father Josef Klečka (from Nehodiv) was a prominent figure in Baltimore. His mother Marie Hraničková was an immigrant from Kvášňovice. August's brother James was Chief Magistrate of the People's Court of Baltimore.

Starting in 1929, Klecka served as the editor of the Telegraf, a Czech-language newspaper in Baltimore.

He was appointed as Federal Marshal for the state of Maryland by Franklin D. Roosevelt, serving from 1933 to 1946.

In 1901, Klecka married Julia Lavicka at St. Wenceslaus Catholic Church. She died in 1931 while he served as acting mayor. In 1932, he married a widow, Lillian Lottes-Bricker, at the Methodist Episcopal Church in Frederick.

After Klecka's death in 1946, his wife Lillian took over his role as Ward 7's most important political figure.

See also
History of the Czechs in Baltimore

References

External links
August Klecka in the 1940 Census

American people of Bohemian descent
Baltimore City Council members
Burials at Bohemian National Cemetery (Baltimore)
Czech-American culture in Baltimore
Editors of Maryland newspapers
Maryland Democrats
United States Marshals
1878 births
1946 deaths
20th-century American newspaper publishers (people)
20th-century American politicians
American people of Czech descent